BC Soccer is the governing body of adult and youth soccer in British Columbia, Canada. They are the head association for all FIFA affiliated soccer associations in BC. BCSA is located in Vancouver, British Columbia's largest city. There are different levels of play under this association. The British Columbia Soccer Premier League (BCSPL) is the highest level of play, followed by the Metro Select League (MSL), and then what was commonly known as "Gold", "Silver", "Bronze", and "House". These categories have now been changed to a divisional tiering beginning with Division 1, Division 2, and so on, where promotion and relegation processes align with professional leagues. These divisions are split by age, gender, and geographic location.

Sanctioned competitions

Pro-am (third tier)
League1 British Columbia

Amateur
Fraser Valley Soccer League
Pacific Coast Soccer League
Vancouver Island Soccer League
Vancouver Metro Soccer League

Each amateur league except for the PCSL sends some of their teams to the British Columbia Provincial Soccer Championship.

Youth

BC Soccer member clubs 

source

See also
 British Columbia Provincial Soccer Championship

References

External links
 

 
Soccer governing bodies in Canada
Soccer
Sports organizations established in 1904